Prince Ernst of Hohenberg (Ernst Alfons Franz Ignaz Joseph Maria Anton von Hohenberg; 27 May 1904 – 5 March 1954) was the second son of Archduke Franz Ferdinand of Austria and his morganatic wife Sophie, Duchess of Hohenberg, who were assassinated at Sarajevo in 1914.

Life

Prince Ernst was born at his parents' estate at Konopiště in Bohemia. Following his parents' assassination, which precipitated World War I, Ernst and his siblings, Sophie and Maximilian, were taken in by their uncle, Prince Jaroslav von Thun und Hohenstein.

In late 1918, their properties in Czechoslovakia, including Konopiště and Chlumec nad Cidlinou, were confiscated. The children moved to Vienna and Schloß Artstetten.

In 1938, following the Anschluss, some of the family members were arrested. Prince Ernst, having previously spoken at pro-monarchist meetings and having publicly opposed the Anschluss, was sent to Dachau concentration camp with his brother. Prince Ernst was later transferred to other camps and was freed in 1943. The family's Austrian properties were confiscated in 1939, but they were returned in 1945.

Marriage and issue

Prince Ernst married on 25 May 1936 in Vienna, Marie-Thérèse Wood (9 May 1910 in Vienna – 28 November 1985 in Radmer). She was daughter of Captain George Jervis Wood (1887-1974) and his wife, Countess Rosa Lónyay de Nagy-Lónya et Vásáros-Namény (1888-1970), daughter of Count Albert Lónyay de Nagy-Lónya et Vásáros-Namény (1850-1923) and Princess Marie of Hohenlohe-Bartenstein (1861-1933), elder sister of Princess Eleonora Fugger von Babenhausen. The couple had two children:
 Prince Franz Ferdinand Maximilian Georg Ernst Maria Josef Zacharius Ignaz of Hohenberg (14 March 1937 in Vienna – 8 August 1978 in Graz), married Heide Zechling (born 4 January 1941 in Eisenerz). They have one son.
 Prince Ernst Georg Elemer Albert Josef Antonius Peregrinus Rupertus Maria of Hohenberg (1 March 1944 in Vienna – 12 January 2023), first married Patricia Caesar (born 12 June 1950 in Glen Cove) in 1973; they divorced in 1999. In 2007 he married Margareta Anna Ndisi (born 26 November 1959 in Östhammar. He has one daughter from his first marriage.

Death
Prince Ernst died at Graz in Austria in 1954, aged 49. He is buried in the crypt of the Hohenberg family's Artstetten Castle in Lower Austria. His wife's remains are in a sarcophagus to the right of his.

Honours
  Austro-Hungarian Imperial and Royal Family: Knight of the Order of the Golden Fleece, 1945

Ancestry

References

1904 births
1954 deaths
20th-century Austrian people
20th-century Czech people
Austrian princes
Austrian people of German Bohemian descent
Austrian people of Czech descent
Bohemian nobility
Chotek family
Dachau concentration camp survivors
Czech people of Austrian descent
Czechoslovak refugees
German Bohemian people
Ernst
People from Benešov
Knights of the Golden Fleece of Austria